Timo Schultz (born 26 August 1977) is a German former footballer, and manager, who last managed FC St. Pauli.

Career
Born in Wittmund, Schultz is a youth product of Werder Bremen. After playing for the club's reserves for four years, he went on to play for VfB Lübeck and Holstein Kiel.

In 2005, Schultz joined FC St. Pauli as a midfielder. He made his professional debut in the 2. Bundesliga on 10 August 2007 when he started in a game against 1. FC Köln. After the 2009–10 season, St. Pauli was promoted to the Bundesliga, where he debuted on 25 September 2010 against Borussia Dortmund. His career ended in 2012.

Since 2011, Schultz worked in the coaching staff of FC St. Pauli as an assistant coach and youth coach. On 12 July 2020, it was announced that he would be head coach of St. Pauli for the 2020–21 season. This is his first head coaching position of a senior side. His first match was a 4–2 loss to SV Elversberg in the DFB-Pokal. He was sacked in December 2022.

Coaching record

References

External links
 

1977 births
Living people
Association football midfielders
German footballers
VfB Lübeck players
Holstein Kiel players
FC St. Pauli players
SV Werder Bremen II players
Holstein Kiel II players
FC St. Pauli II players
Bundesliga players
2. Bundesliga players
Regionalliga players
Oberliga (football) players
German football managers
FC St. Pauli managers
Footballers from Lower Saxony
People from Wittmund